"Lady Lou" is the debut single by German heavy metal band Accept, from their 1979 self-titled debut album. The song appears on various Accept compilation albums, including Metal Masters, Best of... and Midnight Highway.

Track listing
Both songs written and composed by Dirkschneider, Baltes, Hoffmann, Fischer and Friedrich.

Personnel
Udo Dirkschneider - lead vocals
Wolf Hoffmann - lead guitar
Jörg Fischer - rhythm guitar
Peter Baltes - bass
Frank Friedrich - drums

References

Accept (band) songs
1979 songs
1979 debut singles